HyperSpike is a brand name for acoustic products manufactured by Ultra Electronics – Undersea Sensor Systems Inc. (USSI), in Columbia City, Indiana. HyperSpike is composed of a line of acoustic hailing devices that feature integrated electronics with a flat frequency response curve.

History 
HyperSpike was originally invented by Curt Graber of Wattre Corporation.  In 2008, Wattre and Ultra Electronics – USSI signed a teaming agreement for the design and manufacture of an array of acoustic hailing devices. Since then, over 8 new devices have been released. HyperSpike products currently hold the Guinness Book of World Records for loudest electro-acoustic projection device at 182.2 dB.

Characteristics 
HyperSpike units are created out of custom composite materials or carbon fiber. Each is sealed against the environment and has been designed to operate in extreme environmental conditions including hot, cold, blowing dust, freezing rain, and torrential downpours. HyperSpike units are weatherproof, not waterproof. Each directional unit has an integrated electronics package, which increases usability and decreases overall package weight. Certain high-output models are also manufactured with an output selector switch that can toggle between the hearing safe "low" and extreme output level "high." Finally, new HyperSpike units have been manufactured with an integrated network port.

Inputs 
All HyperSpike units have three inputs for sound. These inputs use unique Amphenol connectors so that they cannot be accidentally interchanged in extreme situations. The details for each type of connector are below: 
 Dynamic Microphone This CB-Style microphone is designed to adapt to user input.  The louder the input, the louder the HyperSpike output. The dynamic microphone is activated by a thumb-toggle.
 AUX In Using a standard 3.5mm (1/8") headphone jack, a HyperSpike can accept any commercial audio source including iPods, Zunes, and other MP3 players. The AUX In is always on.
 Alert Tone Each HyperSpike has an alert-tone button that puts out a frequency designed to gain attention. This button can only output the alert tone.

Models 
HyperSpike models are divided into two types, directional and omni-directional. The directional units can also be integrated into a remote-controlled platform. The Omnidirectional units can also remote-controlled through an IP network.

Directional models 
Directional HyperSpikes are characterized by their ability to form a narrow beam of sound. This collimated beam can range from 5 degrees to 15 degrees radius at 2 kHz. The current models offered are detailed below with their maximum sound pressure level. 
 HyperShield 140 dB
 HS-Micro 140 dB
 HS-10R 144 db
 HS-16- 148 dB
 HS-18- 153 dB
 HS-24- 153 dB
 HS-40 161 dB
 HS-60 182 dB

Omnidirectional models 
These HyperSpike products emit high volumes in a 360 radius. At 50' the units can be heard over 1.5 miles away. The MA series of acoustic hailing devices consist of a hexagonal array of transducers. As the number of transducers increases, the potential output increases. As such, the MA-2 is essentially two MA-1 emitter heads.  The current models are detailed below with their maximum sound pressure level.  
 TCPA-Omni 140 db
 MA-1 138 dB
 MA-2 144 dB
 MA-3 150 dB

Remote-controlled models 
Recently, the HS-14 and HS-18 have been integrated into a pan/tilt platform with partner corporation MOOG. This platform, named the HS-14 RAHD or HS-18 RAHD (Remote Acoustic Hailing Device), is an IP-controlled remote system that can be integrated with any sensor. In addition, these units can be equipped with advanced software analytics capable of detecting human or machine forms at distances in excess of 1000 meters. Examples of integrable sensors include:
 Daylight Cameras
 Thermal Cameras
 Infrared Cameras
 Night-Vision Cameras
 Illuminator (Adjustable Spot Light)
 Avian Radars
 Ground Radars

Field usage 
Directional HyperSpike models are in service with various domestic and international and private, law enforcement, and military users. Notable users include the United States Navy, United States Army, United States Coast Guard, Allen County SWAT (Fort Wayne, IN), the French Navy, the Malaysian Navy, Indonesia Police and various international energy conglomerates.

The MA-1 is currently in service with the United States Army for their Counter Rocket, Artillery, and Mortar (C-RAM) program. In addition, units have been fielded for use at large tradeshows, for the United States Air Force, and international navies.

See also 
Acoustic Hailing Device
Sound pressure
Acoustics
Loudspeaker

References

External links 
 HyperSpike's Official Website

Loudspeakers